Paxillus is a genus of mushrooms of which most are known to be poisonous or inedible. Species include Paxillus involutus and Paxillus vernalis. Two former species—Tapinella panuoides and Tapinella atrotomentosa—have now been transferred to the related genus Tapinella in the family Tapinellaceae

Paxillus means small stake.

Edibility
While this genus has in the past been erroneously considered edible, it is now known to be poisonous and has been linked to a number of recorded fatalities. The deadly poisonings appear to have been due to eating the mushrooms raw.

Species
, Index Fungorum lists 38 valid species in Paxillus:

Paxillus albidulus
Paxillus amazonicus
Paxillus ammoniavirescens
Paxillus atraetopus
Paxillus brunneotomentosus
Paxillus chalybaeus
Paxillus coffeaceus
Paxillus defibulatus
Paxillus fasciculatus
Paxillus fechtneri
Paxillus guttatus
Paxillus gymnopus
Paxillus hortensis
Paxillus ianthinophyllus
Paxillus involutus
Paxillus ionipus
Paxillus leoninus
Paxillus maculatus
Paxillus minutesquamulosus
Paxillus obscurisporus
Paxillus ochraceus
Paxillus pahangensis
Paxillus piperatus
Paxillus polychrous
Paxillus rhytidophyllus
Paxillus robiniae
Paxillus rubicundulus
Paxillus scleropus
Paxillus serbicus
Paxillus squamosus
Paxillus validus
Paxillus velenovskyi
Paxillus vernalis
Paxillus yunnanensis
Paxillus zerovae

References

External links
 
 

Paxillaceae
Boletales genera